The Portrait of Count-Duke de Olivares is a painting by Spanish artist Diego Velázquez, finished in 1635. It is housed in the Hermitage Museum of St. Petersburg.

The picture portrays Gaspar de Guzmán, Count-Duke of Olivares, Prime Minister of Spain during the reign of Philip IV. He is portrayed in half bust over a neutral background, the face appearing tired and swollen, markedly aged from the previous, more famous equestrian portrait of Duke de Olivares also by Velázquez. Olivares wears a simple black dress with a white ruff.

References

External links
Velázquez , exhibition catalog from The Metropolitan Museum of Art (fully available online as PDF), which contains material on this portrait (see index)

Portraits by Diego Velázquez
Portraits of men
1635 paintings
17th-century portraits
Paintings by Diego Velázquez in the Hermitage Museum